Claude Netter (23 October 1924, in Paris, France – 13 June 2007) was a French Olympic champion foil fencer.

Netter competed in three Olympiads for the French foil team, winning two medals.  Netter was Jewish.

Fencing career

French Championships

Netter was the French national foil champion in 1952.

World Championships
Netter was a member of the French team that won the gold medal at the World Championships in 1951, 1953 and 1958. In 1959 he won silver at the World Championships in the individual foil competition.

Olympics
Netter won a gold medal in team foil at the 1952 Summer Olympics in Helsinki. The French team defeated Egypt (15–1), Hungary (12–4), and Italy (8–6) in the finals.

He won a silver medal in team foil in the 1956 Summer Olympics in Melbourne and placed 6th in individual foil.

Netter's final Olympic appearance was in Rome at the 1960 Summer Olympics in the team foil competition. The French team placed 5th.

See also
List of select Jewish fencers

References

1924 births
2007 deaths
French male foil fencers
Jewish French sportspeople
Jewish male foil fencers
Olympic fencers of France
Fencers at the 1952 Summer Olympics
Fencers at the 1956 Summer Olympics
Fencers at the 1960 Summer Olympics
Olympic gold medalists for France
Olympic silver medalists for France
Olympic medalists in fencing
Fencers from Paris
Medalists at the 1952 Summer Olympics
Medalists at the 1956 Summer Olympics
Mediterranean Games bronze medalists for France
Mediterranean Games medalists in fencing
Fencers at the 1951 Mediterranean Games